Peter Kendall Cullins (November 19, 1928 – May 3, 2012) was an American U.S. Navy admiral who commanded the USS Waddell and the USS Little Rock, a 1000-man guided missile cruiser and the flagship for Commander of the Sixth Fleet.

Cullins was born on November 19, 1928 in Annapolis, Maryland, he graduated from the U.S. Naval Academy with a bachelor of science degree in 1951. On January 1, 1977, he became the first commander of the Naval Data Automation Command. In March 1980, he became Commander South Atlantic Force. He retired as a Rear Admiral the following year.

References

1928 births
2012 deaths
Recipients of the Legion of Merit
United States Navy rear admirals
People from Annapolis, Maryland
United States Naval Academy alumni